Transfinite may refer to:
 Transfinite number, a number larger than all finite numbers, yet not absolutely infinite
 Transfinite induction, an extension of mathematical induction to well-ordered sets
 Transfinite recursion
 Transfinite arithmetic, the generalization of elementary arithmetic to infinite quantities
 Transfinite interpolation, a method in numerical analysis to construct functions over a planar domain so that they match a given function on the boundary